The Pakistan women's cricket team toured the West Indies to play the West Indies women's cricket team in June and July 2021. The tour consisted of three Women's Twenty20 International (WT20I) and five Women's One Day International (WODI) matches. 

The respective A teams also played three 20-over and three limited overs matches against each other, with the WT20I and 20-over matches played as double-headers. It was the first ever bilateral A team series by the two teams. The 50-over matches were used as preparation for the 2021 Women's Cricket World Cup Qualifier.

In the opening match of the series, Nida Dar became the first bowler, male of female, to take 100 wickets in T20I cricket for Pakistan.

On 2 July 2021, during the second WT20I match, West Indies players Chinelle Henry and Chedean Nation collapsed on the field in a space of ten minutes, at the Coolidge Cricket Ground in Antigua. Both of them were immediately taken to hospital, where they were reported to be conscious and stable. However, the match continued, with both players replaced by substitutes. Both of them recovered and joined the West Indies' squad ahead of the third WT20I.

Pakistan's A Team won the first two 20-over fixtures, to win the series with a match to spare. Conversely, the West Indies won the first two WT20I matches, to also win the series with a game to spare. The Pakistan A Team won the third 20-over match by eight wickets, to win the series 3–0. The West Indies won the third WT20I match by six wickets, to win the series 3–0. The West Indies won the first three WODI matches, to win the series with two games to spare. Pakistan A continued their winning streak, with victory in the first two 50-over matches, taking an unassailable series lead. Pakistan A won their final match by seven wickets to remain unbeaten across all six of their matches. In the final match of the tour, Pakistan beat the West Indies by 22 runs in a rain-affected match, with the West Indies winning the WODI series 3–2.

Squads

Pakistan did not name individual squads for the WODI and WT20I matches, opting instead to name a combined squad of 26 players for the tour. Conversely, the West Indies named squads for both the national and A teams. Stafanie Taylor was named as their captain, with Reniece Boyce leading the A Team for both the 20-over and 50-over matches. On 12 July 2021, Cricket West Indies added Shabika Gajnabi, Chinelle Henry and Rashada Williams to their WODI squad for the final three matches. Rameen Shamim was ruled out of Pakistan's squad for the fourth WODI match due to an injury.

WT20I series

1st WT20I

2nd WT20I

3rd WT20I

WODI series

1st WODI

2nd WODI

3rd WODI

4th WODI

5th WODI

A Team 20-over series

1st 20-over match

2nd 20-over match

3rd 20-over match

A Team 50-over series

1st 50-over match

2nd 50-over match

3rd 50-over match

Notes

References

External links
 Series home at ESPN Cricinfo
 Series home (A Team) at ESPN Cricinfo

Women's international cricket tours of the West Indies
2021 in West Indian cricket
2021 in Pakistani cricket
International cricket competitions in 2021
West Indies 2021
2021 in women's cricket
A team cricket
2021 in Pakistani women's sport